Whanganui City College is located in Ingestre Street, Whanganui. It became Wanganui City College in 1994. It was formerly the Wanganui Technical College established in 1911 and it became Wanganui Boys' College in 1964.

Notable alumni 

Peter Belliss (1965–68), World and Commonwealth bowls champion
Ruka Broughton, tohunga, Anglican priest, and university lecturer
Sir Paul Callaghan (1947–2012), professor, physicist, and 2011 New Zealander of the Year  
Air Commodore Al Deere, OBE, DSO, DFC & Bar, Battle of Britain pilot and author
Arnold Downer (1895–1984), civil engineer, construction contractor and company director 
Andy Haden (1965–1968), All Black
Michael Laws (1970–74, Hostel), Mayor of Whanganui 2004–10, National MP 1990–96, broadcaster, writer
Mark Burton (1969–73), Labour MP & Cabinet Minister 1993–2008 
Waisake Naholo, All Black
Paul Perez, Samoan Rugby International
Akapusi Qera, Fijian Rugby International 
Graham Sims (1964–67, Hostel), All Black
Rana Waitai, NZ First MP 1990–93
Noel Scott, Labour MP Tongaririo 1984–90, founding principal Makoura College
James Allen Ward, RNZAF pilot, recipient of VC
Dick Tonks, New Zealand national rowing coach and Olympic medallist
Chris Masoe, All Black

Early years

Wanganui Technical College
The school was established in 1911, an amalgamation of the Wanganui Technical School of Design (est. 1892) and Victoria Avenue District High School.

Wanganui Boys' College
Wanganui Technical College became Wanganui Boys' College from 1964.

References

Secondary schools in Manawatū-Whanganui
Schools in Whanganui